Neonotoporus is a genus of trematodes in the family Opecoelidae.

Species
Neonotoporus carangis (Yamaguti, 1951)
Neonotoporus decapteri Parukhin, 1966
Neonotoporus gibsoni Ahmad, 1990
Neonotoporus leiognathi (Hafeezullah, 1971) Ahmad, 1985
Neonotoporus maruadsi Yamaguti, 1970
Neonotoporus novaezelandicus Lebedev, 1968
Neonotoporus opelii Yamaguti, 1970
Neonotoporus overstreeti Ahmad & Dhar, 1987
Neonotoporus skrjabini Ahmad, 1987
Neonotoporus srivastavai Ahmad & Dhar, 1987
Neonotoporus trachuri (Yamaguti, 1938) Srivastava, 1942
Neonotoporus yamagutii Manter, 1947

References

Opecoelidae
Plagiorchiida genera